Laurence Boswell (born 1959) is a theatre director, whose credits include Ben Elton's Popcorn, Madonna in her London stage debut, Eddie Izzard in a revival of A Day in the Death of Joe Egg, and Matt Damon, Jake Gyllenhaal, Hayden Christensen, Freddie Prinze Jr and Anna Paquin for West End debuts in This Is Our Youth, which, in 2002, ran concurrently with Up for Grabs, featuring Madonna.

Boswell was appointed an associate director at the Royal Shakespeare Company in 2003, for whom he opened an expanded version of his children's Christmas show, Beauty and the Beast.

External links
20 questions with Laurence Boswell
Complete playwright guide

1959 births
Living people
British theatre directors